Phyllothallia is a small genus of liverworts of the Southern Hemisphere.  It is classified in the order  Pallaviciniales and is the only member of the family  Phyllothalliaceae within that order.  Unlike most members of the Metzgeriales, Phyllothallia has a leafy appearance.  The genus has a disjunct distribution, with the species Phyllothallia nivicola found in New Zealand while the other species in the genus, Phyllothallia fuegiana, occurs in Tierra del Fuego.

References
yo mama plant

Pallaviciniales
Liverwort genera